Didactic gospels is a collection of sermons. Their prototype is considered the didactic of Bishop Constantine of Preslav in 894 written in the Church Slavonic language.

List of known published gospels
 1569 Published in Zabłudów by Ivan Fyodorov and Pyotr Mstislavets
 1595 Published in Vilno
 1619 Published in the Regina Wisniowiecka estate near Rokhmaniv, Volhynian Voivodeship by Kyrylo Stavrovetsky
 In 1622 on the decree of Tsar Michael I of Russia all copies of the gospel were ordered to be burned (Chronology of Ukrainian language bans).
 1637 Published by Kiev Pechersk Lavra
 1637 Published by Vasiliy Burtsov-Protopopov
 1680 Published in Vilno by Vasiliy Garaburda
 1696 Published in Univ Lavra by Kyrylo Stavrovetsky
 1697 Published in Univ Lavra by Kyrylo Stavrovetsky
 1697 Published by Mogilev Fraternity (Brotherhood)

External links
 Didactic gospels at the Encyclopedia of Ukraine

Golden Age of medieval Bulgarian culture
East Slavic manuscripts
Gospel Books
16th-century biblical manuscripts
16th-century illuminated manuscripts
17th-century biblical manuscripts
17th-century illuminated manuscripts